Alta Vista is a small neighborhood in southeastern San Diego, California, United States. It is bordered by National City to the west, Bay Terraces to the east, Encanto and Valencia Park to the north.

With the great influx of Filipino immigrants joining the United States Navy, especially from the Vietnam War era on to the 1990s, many Filipinos inhabited the Southeast San Diego neighborhoods of Alta Vista, Bay Terraces, Paradise Hills, Shelltown, Skyline Hills, and Valencia Park, both for the relatively affordable housing prices and its close proximity to Naval Base San Diego.

See also

 List of neighborhoods of San Diego, California

References

External links
 List of neighborhoods in San Diego

Neighborhoods in San Diego